This is a list of notable people from the Rangpur City, Bangladesh.

Presidents of Bangladesh 

 Abu Sadat Mohammad Sayem, 6th President of Bangladesh
 Hussain Muhammad Ershad, former President of Bangladesh, founder Jatiya Party

Chief Justices of Bangladesh 

 Abu Sadat Mohammad Sayem, 1st chief justice of Bangladesh
 Mostafa Kamal, 10th Chief Justice of Bangladesh

Speakers of Parliament 

 Shah Abdul Hamid, 1st speaker of the Constituent Assembly of Bangladesh also 1st Speaker of the Jatiya Sangsad(Parliament of Bangladesh)

Chief Ministers
 Abu Hussain Sarkar, 4th  Chief Minister of East Pakistan, one of the founders of  United Front, founder of  Bangla Academy and a Swadeshi movement revolutionary

Civil servants 
 Hassan Mahmood Khandker, 26th Inspector General of Bangladesh Police, He was the longest serving Inspector General in Bangladesh Police's history.

Freedom fighters in The Liberation War 

 Sharif Imam, husband of Shahid janoni Jahanara Imam

Performing and fine arts 

 Asaduzzaman Noor, actor, politician and activist. Former Minister of Cultural Affairs and MP, popular for his role of Baker Bhai in Kothao Keu Nei
 Abbasuddin Ahmed, Independence Day Awardee, Bhawaiya and Ghazal singer
 Debi Prasad Roy Chowdhury, sculptor
 Dipankar Dipon, film director and screenwriter who predominantly works in Dhallywood
 Ferdausi Rahman,  Independence Day Awardee and Ekushey Padak winner legendary folk and playback singer
 Mashiat Rahman, actress
 Mustafa Zaman Abbasi, Ekushey Padak winner Bangladeshi musicologist
 Rathindranath Roy, founder of Bhawaiya academy and singer
 Rezwana Choudhury Bannya, Rabindra Sangeet artist
 Tulsi Lahiri, actor and dramatist

Officers of Bangladesh Armed Forces 

 General Mustafizur Rahman, 9th Chief of Army Staff of the Bangladesh Army
 Lieutenant General Hussain Muhammad Ershad, 4th Chief of Army Staff of the Bangladesh Army

Politicians 

M. Abdur Rahim, member of Drafting committee of Bangladesh constitution. Member of Constituent Assembly and former MP.
Mashiur Rahman Jadu Mia (Politician, Founding member of Bangladesh Nationalist Party and Senior Minister with the rank of a Prime Minister in 1979)
 Tipu Munshi, Current Minister of Commerce of Bangladesh, former president BGMEA, Awami League politician
 Mashiur Rahaman Ranga Bangladeshi MP and  Jatiya Party leader
 M. A. Sattar, Chairman Sattar Jute Mills Ltd, Minister of Jute and Textiles, Minister of Labor and Manpower, Member of Parliament and Chief Whip
 Sharfuddin Ahmed Jhantu First Mayor of Rangpur City Corporation, Jatiya Party leader
Raufun Basunia, student leader, killed during an anti-autocratic protest against military ruler Hussain Muhammad Ershad in 1985

Poet, writers and journalists 

 Anisul Hoque, author, novelist, dramatist, and journalist
 Rashid Askari, academic, writer, fictionist, columnist, translator, media personality and the 12th vice-chancellor of Islamic University, Bangladesh
 Buddhadeb Guha, author, novelist and bengali fiction writer
 Monajatuddin, journalist
Rebati Mohan Dutta Choudhury, Assamese litterateur, Sahitya Akademi Award winner and an academician

British revolutionaries 

 Majnu Shah, leader of the Fakir-Sannyasi Rebellion. He used to operate in this region.
Sri Aurobindo, British Indian philosopher, yogi, maharishi, poet, and nationalist. Spent his childhood here.
 Prafulla Chaki, British Indian revolutionary, famous for attempting to murder of a British official along with khudiram Bose. Studied at the Rangpur Zilla School.
 Devi Chaudhurani, revolutionary, one of the organizers of the  Fakir-Sannyasi Rebellion

Reformers and activists 

 Begum Rokeya Shakhawat Hossain, who was most famous for her efforts on behalf of gender equality and other social issues
 Karimunnesa Khanam Chaudhurani, Bengali poet, social worker, and patron of literature

Scholars and scientists 

 Annette Beveridge, British Indologist, known works being the translations of the Baburnama from the Turki (Turkish) language, and the Humayun-nama from Persian
 William Beveridge, British economist who wrote the Beveridge Report that influenced United Kingdom to implement welfare state policies after World War II
 M. A. Wazed Miah reputed Bangladeshi nuclear scientist who was former Chairman of the Bangladesh Atomic Energy Commission. He is the husband of Prime Minister Sheikh Hasina Wazed

Sports 

 Nasir Hossain, all-round cricketer
 Akbar ali, cricketer, World Cup winning captain of Bangladesh under-19 team in under-19 world cup 2020
 Mishrat Jahan Moushumi, Women's footballer, Bangladesh Women's National Team
 Sirat Jahan Shopna, Women's footballer, Bangladesh Women's National Team

References

Rangpur
Rangpur District
Rangpur Division